Quercus chenii is a species of oak native to southeast China. It is in subgenus Cerris, section Cerris. Some authorities feel that it could be a synonym of Quercus acutissima.

References

chenii
Trees of China
Endemic flora of China
Plants described in 1924